Mario C. Lugones (born 13 August 1912 - 1 October 1970 Buenos Aires) was an Argentine film director. He directed films such as the 1950 film Abuso de confianza.

Lugones died in 1970 of cancer in Buenos Aires.

Filmography
Director
1944 - Se rematan ilusiones
1947 - El Último guapo
1948 - Novio, marido y amante, La Locura de Don Juan
1949 - Un Pecado por mes, Miguitas en la cama, Un Hombre solo no vale nada
1950 - El Zorro pierde el pelo, Abuso de confianza
1951 - Mujer del león, La, Cartas de amor
1952 - ¡Qué rico el mambo!
1954 - La Cueva de Ali-Babá
1955 - Ensayo final, La Simuladora
1962 - Misión 52
Actor
1941 El mejor papá del mundo
1955 La simuladora

External links
 

1912 births
1970 deaths
Deaths from cancer in Argentina
Argentine film directors
Place of birth missing